Byers Independent School District was a public school district based in Byers, Texas (USA).

In May 2012, the district's voters and those of the neighboring Petrolia Independent School District voted to consolidate the two districts, with Petrolia remaining the surviving district after the merger. The merger took effect May 25, 2012.

References

External links
 
 
 Map of Clay County showing area school districts prior to BISD consolidation - Texas Education Agency - Web version

Former school districts in Texas
School districts in Clay County, Texas
School districts disestablished in 2012
2012 disestablishments in Texas